Michael K. Sheridan (born September 26, 1934) is a retired Brigadier General in the U.S. Marine Corps.  His last post was to serve as the Director of Policies and Operations Department, Headquarters Marine Corps in Washington, D.C.

Prior to that position he served as Director of Facilities and Services Division at Headquarters Marine Corps. Sheridan also served as Deputy Commanding General for the Marine Corps Recruit Depot, located at Parris Island, South Carolina.

Education
Sheridan received a bachelor's degree in geology from Florida State University in 1956. He earned a master's degree in management from George Washington University in 1966.

Awards and decorations
General Sheridan has been awarded the following, along with numerous unit, service and campaign awards:

References

External links

Official biography

George Washington University alumni
Florida State University alumni
1934 births
Recipients of the Legion of Merit
United States Marine Corps generals
Living people
Recipients of the Defense Superior Service Medal